George Granville Harcourt (né Venables-Harcourt and Vernon-Harcourt, 6 August 1785 – 19 December 1861) was a British Whig and then Conservative Party politician.

Background
Harcourt was the eldest son of clergyman Edward Venables-Vernon-Harcourt.

Political career
Harcourt was elected as MP for Lichfield in 1806 and which he represented until he was elected for Oxfordshire in 1831. By 1850 he had become the longest-serving member, and so became the Father of the House of Commons for the last 11 years of his life.

Family
On 27 March 1815, he married Lady Elizabeth Bingham (the eldest daughter of the 2nd Earl of Lucan) and they had one child, Elizabeth Lavinia Anne (d. 1858, married Montagu Bertie, 6th Earl of Abingdon). Harcourt's wife died in 1838 and he then married Frances Waldegrave (the widow of the 7th Earl Waldegrave and future wife of the 1st Baron Carlingford), a daughter of the noted tenor, John Braham.

References

External links 
 

1785 births
1861 deaths
Members of the Parliament of the United Kingdom for English constituencies
UK MPs 1806–1807
UK MPs 1807–1812
UK MPs 1812–1818
UK MPs 1818–1820
UK MPs 1820–1826
UK MPs 1826–1830
UK MPs 1830–1831
UK MPs 1831–1832
UK MPs 1832–1835
UK MPs 1835–1837
UK MPs 1837–1841
UK MPs 1841–1847
UK MPs 1847–1852
UK MPs 1852–1857
UK MPs 1857–1859
UK MPs 1859–1865
Whig (British political party) MPs for English constituencies
Conservative Party (UK) MPs for English constituencies